Vasiliy (Vasily) Sad  (born in 1948) is a Ukrainian abstract painter. He has been an active member "apartment exhibitions" in Odessa, which defended alternative forms of art against the Socialist Realism endorsed by the Soviet Union.

Early artistic career 
Born in the Velyki Telkovychi village (Rivne oblast) in Ukraine in 1948, Vasiliy Sad moved to Odessa where he then graduated from the Grekov College of Arts in 1977. Shortly after his graduation he joined the "Mamai" group, a collective of non-conformist abstract painters named after Ukraine's national hero. From the early 1970s, the members of the group took an active part in the dissident Odessa Group. They displayed their art on the occasion of illegal "apartment exhibitions" in Odessa and Moscow, as they championed Soviet Nonconformist Art in the Ukraine.

Collections and Exhibitions 
Works by Vasily Sad are in art collections of the National Art Museum (Kyiv, Ukraine); the Museum of Modern Art (Kyiv, Ukraine); the Khmelnitsky Museum of Modern Ukrainian art,  Odessa Museum of Modern Art , the Odessa Museum of Eastern and Western Art and  international art collections in America, Canada, the UK, Italy, Monaco, UAE, Russia and Ukraine. Works by Vasily Sad have been sold at  Phillips auction house, MacDougalls's Auction , Zurich International Contemporary Art Fair (Switzerland), Edinburgh Art Fair (Scotland) and Indian Art Summit (Delhi).

 2012 15–28 February, Beauty in the Ordinary – solo exhibition, Mount Street Gallery, London
 2011 25–27 June, Phillips de Pury Contemporary auction, London 
 2011 6–9 June, Auction MacDougall's, London 
 2011 12–15 April, AFTERMATH solo exhibition in commemoration of 25th Anniversary of Chernobyl Disaster; Embassy of Ukraine in the UK
 2011 20-21 International Art Fair, Kensington Gore, Royal College of Arts, London 
 2010 Edinburgh Art Fair, Scotland 
 2010 Zurich International Contemporary ArtFair, Switzerland 
 2010 II Russian Art Fair, Hilton Park Lane, London 
 2010 Chelsea Art Fair, London 
 2010 20-21 International Art Fair, Kensington Gore, Royal College of Arts, London 
 2009 Russian Art Fair, Carlton Tower Hotel, London 
 2009 Solo exhibition, NT-Art gallery, Odessa, Ukraine
 2005 “Mamai” art group exhibition, Museum of contemporary Ukrainian art, Khmelnitsky, Ukraine
 2003 Odessa artists exhibition, Museum of Western and Easter Art, Odessa, Ukraine
 2002 Graphic art exhibition, Odessa Sea Art gallery, Ukraine
 2002 National art festival “Cultural heroes”, Odessa, Ukraine
 2001 International Biennale of modern graphical art, Kyiv, Ukraine
 2001 Ukraine Triennial “Art-2001″, Kyiv, Ukraine
 2001 Odessa Sea Art gallery, Odessa, Ukraine
 2001 “Mamai” art group exhibition, Odessa Contemporary Museum, Ukraine
 2000 “Mamai” art group exhibition, Odessa, Ukraine
 2000 Graphic art Triennial, Kyiv, Ukraine
 1999 IV Ukrainian Art Congress exhibition, Odessa, Ukraine
 1998 “Mamai” art group exhibition (Odessanon-conformist), across Ukraine
 1998 Ukraine Triennial “Art-98″, Kyiv, Ukraine
 1996 Art club-96 exhibition, Khmelnitsky, Ukraine
 1995 Ukraine-95 Art exhibition, Dnipropetrovsk, Ukraine
 1995 “Kandinsky life in Odessa” exhibition, Odessa, Ukraine
 1994 Group exhibition of art group “Boat”, Odessa, Ukraine
 1994 3rd Anniversary of Ukrainian Independence exhibition, Odessa, Ukraine
 1991 Biennale “Impresa”, Ukraine
 1987 Odessa monumental art exhibition, Odessa, Ukraine
 1984 Ukrainian Art exhibition, Kyiv, Ukraine
In the 1970s Odessa nonconformist artists among whom was Vasily Sad took an active part in the unofficial, so called “apartment exhibitions”.

References

External links
 Artist’s profile on Saatchi
 Artelia – the artist’s gallery
 YouTube Video about Artist
 NT- Art Gallery
 Article on Vasiliy Sad in Today.od.ua
The Independent article on Vasily Sadl
 Beauty in the Ordinary Exhibition
 Absolutearts
 ARTslanT
 Artnet Auction results
 ArtPrice on Vasily Sad auction results
 Odessa Modern Artists
 The Art Stack

Ukrainian artists
Abstract painters
Russian avant-garde
Living people
1948 births